George Ernest Killian (April 6, 1924 – December 6, 2017) was an American sports administrator, president of the International University Sports Federation (FISU) and the International Basketball Federation (FIBA)

After receiving his Bachelor of Science degree in education from the Ohio Northern University in 1949, Killian obtained a Master's degree in Education from the University at Buffalo, N.Y. in 1954. The Ohio Northern University honored him in 1989 with a PhD in Public Service.

Killian coached basketball teams of Wharton High School between 1949 and 1951 and Erie Community College, Buffalo, N.Y. from 1954 to 1969. He was president of the international basketball federation FIBA between 1990 and 1998. In 1996, he was member of the International Olympic Committee in his capacity as president of FIBA. Killian served also as treasurer of COPABA, Panamaerican Basketball Confederation and director of the NJCAA, National Junior College Athletic Association.

After presiding the US delegation at the Universiades three times, Killian held office in FISU. He was member of the International Control Commission from 1975 to 1987. Then, he was elected vice president of FISU. In 1995, Killian was promoted to First Vice President. On November 26, 1999, he was confirmed as FISU President by the executive committee succeeding late Dr. Primo Nebiolo.

On August 5, 2007, Killian was reelected for a second full term as president of FISU by an overwhelming majority of the votes at FISU's 30th General Assembly, which was held in Bangkok, Thailand.

On August 9, 2011, he was replaced by Claude-Louis Gallien as FISU President.

Accomplishments:

President of the International University Sports Federation (FISU) – 1999–2011
President of the International Basketball Federation (FIBA) – 1990–1998
Member of the International Olympic Committee (IOC) – 1996–1998
President of the Naismith Memorial Basketball Hall of Fame – 1977–1978
Board of trustees of the Naismith Memorial Basketball Hall of Fame – 1969–2004
Award winner – Men's Naismith Outstanding Contribution to Basketball – 2004
Inductee to the Women's Basketball Hall of Fame – 2000

Awards:

Ohio Northern University Athletic Hall of Fame – 1979
W.P. Fehring Award of Merit from the U.S. Baseball Federation – 1982
NJCAA Baseball Coaches Hall of Fame – 1987
NJCAA Basketball Hall of Fame – 1988
John W. Bunn Award from the Naismith Memorial Basketball Hall of Fame – 1989
Gold Medal Award from the Basketball Federation of Poland – 1998
FIBA Order of Merit – 2000
FIBA Hall of Fame - 2010

Former Volunteer Positions:

Secretary/Treasurer – U.S. Track and Field Federation
Board of Directors – U.S. Gymnastics Federation, Basketball Federation of the US, Amateur Basketball
Association of the US, U.S. Wrestling Federations
U.S. Olympic Administrative Committee

References 

1924 births
2017 deaths
American women's basketball coaches
High school basketball coaches in the United States
FIBA Hall of Fame inductees
University at Buffalo alumni
Ohio Northern University alumni
People from Valley Stream, New York
Erie Kats men's basketball coaches
Junior college athletic directors in the United States